Cooya Beach is a coastal town and locality in the Shire of Douglas, Queensland, Australia.

Geography 
The locality is low-lying, with housing along most of the coastal strip. Apart from that, the land is mostly undeveloped. The locality includes part of an unnamed island at the mouth of the Mossman River.

History 
The town was named on 1 November 1963.

Education 
There are no schools in Cooya Beach. The nearest government primary and secondary schools are Mossman State School and Mossman State High School respectively, both in Mossman to the south-west.

Amenities 
There is a boat ramp on Bouganvillea Street into the Mossman River. It is managed by the Douglas Shire Council.

References

External links 
 
 

Towns in Queensland
Shire of Douglas
Coastline of Queensland
Localities in Queensland